Virginia Dobrich (born 8 December 1983) is a Uruguayan dancer and occasional actress, model and cabaret entertainer. In 2012 she debuted as a theatre vedette in the Argentinian revue, Excitante. She is known for her work both in Argentina and Uruguay.

Career 
Dobrich began her career as a dancer in Argentina in Bailando por un sueño 2008, as the professional dance partner of La Tota Santillán. They were the 31st pair eliminated of 39 contestants in the competition.

In early 2009 she worked on Bendito total with Tota Santillán.

In 2009 she was recruited by producer Marcelo Tinelli to form part of El Musical de tus Sueños as the dancer for Dallys Ferreira. In that year she performed in Villa Carlos Paz in a theater production of Carnaval de estrellas with Valeria Lynch, Raúl Lavié, Jésica Cirio, and Martin Campilongo.

In 2010 she was cast by journalist Luis Ventura in Uruguay for a program called The City, which aired for a few months.

In late 2010 she was cast in the theater show Excitante with Nito Artaza and Miguel Ángel Cherutti in Argentina. The musical was presented in Mar del Plata, and finished in its fourth musical cycle after the death of its lead, Estela Raval. Dobrich was the first dancer as well as a vedette.

Dobrich works in Uruguay as a model for the magazine v12.

Television 
 2008,  Bailando por un sueño 2008, professional dance partner of Tota Santillán.
 2009,  El musical de tus sueños, professional dance partner of Dallys Ferreira alongside Julián Andrés Carbajal, Andrés Espinel, Adrian Juan and Belén Alonso.
 2011,  "Locos del tomate". Special participation.

Theatre

References

External links

 Nota a Virginia Dobrich.

1983 births
Living people
Uruguayan people of Spanish descent
Uruguayan people of German descent
Uruguayan expatriate actresses in Argentina
Expatriate models in Argentina
Uruguayan female models
Uruguayan female dancers
Uruguayan stage actresses
Uruguayan vedettes
Uruguayan musical theatre female dancers
Uruguayan musical theatre actresses
Uruguayan theatrical dancer-actresses
Reality television participants